Javier Leopoldo Roca Sepúlveda (born 9 August 1977) is a Chilean professional football coach and former player.

Career
As a football player, Roca is a product of Colo-Colo youth system and had a extensive career in Indonesia. Previously, he played for Venezuelan club Deportivo Italchacao from 1999 to 2000 and for Deportes Los Andes, Unión San Felipe Coquimbo Unido and Deportes Arica in his country of birth.

Following his retirement as a football player, he has continued as a manager in Indonesia.

Managerial statistics

Honours
Individual
Copa Indonesia top scorer: 2005

References

External links

1977 births
Living people
Footballers from Santiago
Association football midfielders
Chilean footballers
Colo-Colo footballers
Trasandino footballers
Unión San Felipe footballers
Deportivo Miranda F.C. players
Coquimbo Unido footballers
San Marcos de Arica footballers
PSMS Medan players
Persegi Gianyar players
Persitara Jakarta Utara players
Persija Jakarta players
Persiba Balikpapan players
Persebaya Surabaya players
Gresik United players
Persidafon Dafonsoro players
Persis Solo players
Chilean Primera División players
Tercera División de Chile players
Primera B de Chile players
Venezuelan Primera División players
Liga 1 (Indonesia) players
Liga 2 (Indonesia) players
Chilean expatriate footballers
Chilean expatriate sportspeople in Venezuela
Chilean expatriate sportspeople in Indonesia
Expatriate footballers in Venezuela
Expatriate footballers in Indonesia
Chilean football managers
Arema FC managers
Liga 1 (Indonesia) managers
Chilean expatriate football managers
Expatriate football managers in Indonesia